There are ninety-three colleges and universities in the U.S. state of Michigan that are listed under the Carnegie Classification of Institutions of Higher Education. These institutions include eight research universities, five doctoral/professional universities, fourteen master's universities, and fourteen baccalaureate colleges, as well as thirty-one associates colleges. In addition, there are eighteen institutions classified as special-focus institutions, eleven labeled as baccalaureate/associate's colleges, and two tribal colleges which operate in the state. 

The University of Michigan is the oldest higher-educational institution in the state, and among the earliest research universities in the nation; it was founded in 1817, twenty years before the Michigan Territory achieved statehood. East Lansing-based Michigan State University is the state's largest public institution in terms of enrollment, as it had 50,340 students . With an enrollment of 21,210 students, Baker College of Flint is Michigan's largest private post-secondary institution, while Oak Park-based Yeshiva Gedolah of Greater Detroit is the state's smallest.

The state has seven medical schools, as well as five law schools which are accredited by the American Bar Association. The majority of Michigan's post-secondary institutions are accredited by the Higher Learning Commission (HLC). Most are accredited by multiple agencies, such as the Commission on Collegiate Nursing Education (CCNE), the National Association of Schools of Music (NASM), and the National League for Nursing (NLNAC).

Extant institutions

Research universities

Doctoral/Professional universities

Master's colleges and universities

Baccalaureate colleges

Baccalaureate/Associate's colleges

Associate's colleges

Special-focus institutions

Tribal colleges

Defunct institutions

Key

See also

 List of college athletic programs in Michigan
 Higher education in the United States
 Lists of American institutions of higher education
 List of recognized higher education accreditation organizations

Notes

References

External links
Department of Education listing of accredited institutions in Michigan

Michigan, List of colleges and universities in
Universities and colleges